The 1964–65 Bundesliga was the second season of the Bundesliga, West Germany's premier football league. It began on 22 August 1964 and ended on 15 May 1965. 1. FC Köln were the defending champions.

Season overview

The championship was won by Werder Bremen. Schalke 04 and Karlsruher SC were originally going to be demoted to the Regionalliga. However, the German FA became aware of irregularities regarding transfer fees, signing bonuses and player wages paid by Hertha BSC. A cash audit was ordered, and the evidence collected from there was enough to revoke Hertha's license. In order to avoid any legal battles over Bundesliga membership, the FA decided to expand the league from sixteen to eighteen teams, meaning Schalke and Karlsruhe were spared relegation. Since Berlin should have a representative in the league as well, Tasmania Berlin were promoted besides the winners of the promotion play-off groups for the 1965–66 season.

The 1964–65 season saw the debut of Brazilian players in the Bundesliga. Zézé became the first Brazilian to play in the league when he fielded for 1. FC Köln against Hertha BSC on 22 August 1964 while Raoul Tagliari scored the first-ever Bundesliga goal by a Brazilian for Meidericher SV against 1. FC Nürnberg on 21 November 1964.

Teams
Preußen Münster and 1. FC Saarbrücken were relegated to the Regionalliga after finishing in the last two places. They were replaced by Hannover 96 and Borussia Neunkirchen, who won their respective promotion play-off groups.

League table

Results

Top goalscorers
24 goals
  Rudolf Brunnenmeier (1860 Munich)

22 goals
  Friedhelm Konietzka (Borussia Dortmund)

19 goals
  Christian Müller (1. FC Köln)

15 goals
  Heinz Strehl (1. FC Nürnberg)

14 goals
  Franz Brungs (Borussia Dortmund)
  Uwe Seeler (Hamburger SV)

12 goals
  Peter Grosser (1860 Munich)
  Hartmann Madl (Karlsruher SC)
  Klaus Matischak (FC Schalke 04)
  Elmar May (Borussia Neunkirchen)
  Karl-Heinz Thielen (1. FC Köln)
  Lothar Ulsaß (Eintracht Braunschweig)

Champion squad

References

External links
DFB archive, 1964–65 season 

Bundesliga seasons
1
Germany